Sopore, known as Suyyapur in antiquity, is a city in the Baramulla district of Jammu and Kashmir, India.

Sopore Town has Asia's second largest fruit mandi (wholesale market). It is also known as the Apple Town of Kashmir. Apart from fruit mandi, Sopore is home to one of the Asia's largest freshwater lakes, Wular Lake( which lies inbetween Sopore and Bandipora district. Sopore city spreads to the four areas of  Zaingeer, partly Rafiabad and Sopore Khaas. Some significant localties of Sopore city are Sopore khaas, Wadoora, Arampora, Mahrajpora, chinkipora, Aadipora, Neharpora, Shalpora, Ashpeer, Krankshivan,Sangrama,Warpora,Dooru,Botingoo,Brath,Bomai, Dangerpora, Tujjer Sharief and Batpora

History
Sopore was founded by Utpala engineer and irrigation minister Suyya during the reign of king Avantivarman in 880 CE. As such the name of the city is Suyya-pur, which has been shortened to Sopore. When the engineer Suyya was working in Sopore no people were coming forth to plunge themselves in gushing water. The king, Avantiverman, thereupon ordered that a part of treasury may be thrown into the water; consequently, a large number of people plunged into the river to get as many coins as they could. It was engineer Suyya's idea to throw coins into flooded land not the king.

Pashtun tribesmen such as Mehsud and Afridi from mountainous region of North-West Frontier Province (NWFP) of the newly formed state of Pakistan invaded Sopore on 22 October 1947. In 1989, Sopore became a focus of the separatist activities and violence with frequent protests and strikes.

Demographics 
The urban area consisted of the city which has a municipal committee and some outgrowths. In the urban area there were 37,570 males (53%) and 33,722 females (47%). Of the population, 9,329 (13.1%) were age 0-6: 5,042 males (54%) and 4,287 females (46%). The literacy rate for the people over six was 70.8% (males 78.6%, females 62.3%).

Administration
Sopore is one of the largest subdivisions of the state with 7 tehsils. And it is also the oldest existing subdivision of the state. Bashir Ahmad Bhat (KAS) who is an administrator, has served the sub-division between August 2015 to April 2017 as the Sub-Divisional Magistrate.

Education
The main public educational institutions in Sopore are Government Boys Higher Secondary School Sopore, Government Girls Higher Secondary School Sopore, Nether Field Secondary School, Apex Public School, Sanctorum Public School,Welkin Higher Secondary School, Muslim Education Trust, Government Degree College Sopore, Model Public School Sopore Government Degree College for Women Sopore, Sopore Law College, Industrial Training Institute Jalalabad and Prime Public School Zaingeer. The Sher-e-Kashmir University of Agricultural Sciences and Technology is located in Wadoora, Sopore. Ahmad Memorial Highfield Scientific School Dangerpora Sopore.

An.

.

A

On .

Sports 

AGS, Sopore Students participated in following Sports and Other Competition

References

 
Sopore
Kashmir